XHGYS-FM is a radio station in Guaymas, Sonora. Broadcasting on 90.1 FM, XHGYS is owned by Radiovisa and carries a grupera format.

History
XEGYS-AM 1040 received its concession on July 13, 1994. It was owned by Radio Unido, S.A., a Radiorama subsidiary and broadcast with 1 kW of daytime power. It migrated to FM in 2011. In 2012, the shares of the station were transferred to the Carrizales Luna family which owns Radiovisa.

References

Radio stations in Sonora